Emerald Publishing Limited is a scholarly publisher of academic journals and books in the fields of management, business, education, library studies, health care, and engineering.

History 
Emerald was founded in the United Kingdom in 1967 as Management Consultants Bradford (MCB) UP Ltd. The publisher changed its name to Emerald in 2002 following the success of its Emerald Fulltext database.

In 2007 Emerald acquired a programme of Management and Social Science book serials, series and monographs from Elsevier.

The acquisition of health and social care publisher Pier Professional Limited took place in 2011.

In June 2015, the Emerald acquisition of GoodPractice was announced. GoodPractice is a provider of support tools for leaders and senior managers.

On 10 June 2022, Cambridge Information Group acquired Emerald Group Publishing.

Company 
Emerald Publishing is headquartered in Bingley and led by CEO Vicky Williams since 2018.

Sponsoring 
In 2017 Emerald became the title sponsor of Headingley Stadium with it being renamed Emerald Headingley. As part of the deal the new main stand was named The Emerald Stand. Emerald withdrew their sponsorship in November 2021, following an alleged racism scandal involving the Yorkshire County Cricket Club.

See also
 Internet Research (journal)
  International Journal of Innovation Science
 International Journal of Operations & Production Management
 Program: Electronic Library and Information Systems
 Advances in Librarianship

References

External links
 

Academic publishing companies
Bingley
Book publishing companies of the United Kingdom
Companies based in the City of Bradford
Publishing companies established in 1967
British digital libraries
Online publishing companies of the United Kingdom
1967 establishments in the United Kingdom